Moors and Christians is a 1987 Spanish comedy film directed by Luis García Berlanga. The cast features Fernando Fernán Gómez, Verónica Forqué, Agustín González, Chus Lampreave, José Luis López Vázquez, Andrés Pajares, María Luisa Ponte, Antonio Resines, Pedro Ruiz and Rosa María Sardá.

Plot 
The Planchadell y Calabuig, a family of turrón-makers from Xixona (province of Alicante), travel to Madrid to sell their product. Once there, they are approached by an image consultant.

Cast

Production 
The film had a budget of around 200 million ₧. Filming began in Madrid by May 1987.

Release 
Moors and Christians premiered on 23 October 1987 at the 32nd Seminci, screened as the opening film of the festival. It was theatrically released in Spain on 28 October 1987.

Reception 
Fotogramas gave the film 2 out of 5 stars, deeming it to be one of the most disappointing films in Berlanga's filmography. Ángel Fernández-Santos of El País considered that what was a "state of grace" in Plácido had seemingly slipped into "a state of disgrace" in Moors and Christians. He also noted that while Pajares, Forqué and Ponte's performances worked just fine, the rest of performances only worked intermittently or not at all.

Awards and nominations 

|-
| align = "center" rowspan = "4" | 1988 || rowspan = "4" | 2nd Goya Awards || Best Screenplay || Rafael Azcona & Luis García Berlanga ||  || rowspan = "4" | 
|-
| Best Supporting Actress || Verónica Forqué ||  
|-
| rowspan = "2" | Best Supporting Actor || Agustín González ||  
|-
| Pedro Ruiz || 
|}

See also 
 List of Spanish films of 1987

References 
Citations

Bibliography
 

1987 films
Spanish comedy films
Films directed by Luis García Berlanga
1987 comedy films
Films shot in Madrid
Films set in Madrid
1980s Spanish-language films